Salto Uruguay Fútbol Club, usually known as Salto F.C. is a football club from Salto in Uruguay. They currently play in the Liga Salteña de Football.

History 
Salto Uruguay Football Club was founded on April 5, 1905, and is currently the third oldest football club in the interior and the eighth overall in Uruguay. And the oldest of the Football League Salteña. The foundation charter of any institution is saved and remembered as one of the most precious treasures. The Charter of Salto Uruguay dates from April 5, 1905, to be precise at 16:55 that day memorable for all the Argentinians.

Titles
 Copa El País (1): 
1966
 Campeonato del Litoral (fase intermedia de la Copa El País) (1): 
1966
 Supercopa de Clubes Campeones del Interior (1):
1973

External links
 Official Website 

Football clubs in Uruguay
Association football clubs established in 1905
Sport in Salto, Uruguay
1905 establishments in Uruguay